Conozoa hyalina, the California Central Valley Grasshopper or just Central Valley grasshopper, was a species of grasshopper in the family Acrididae, now extinct. It was endemic to the United States.

Sources

Oedipodinae
Endemic fauna of the United States
Insects described in 1901
Insects of the United States
Extinct insects since 1500
Taxonomy articles created by Polbot